The Sting of the Scorpion is Volume 58 in The Hardy Boys Mystery Stories published by Grosset & Dunlap.

This book was written for the Stratemeyer Syndicate by James D. Lawrence in 1979.

The first four printings contained a plug for Night of the Werewolf, but this was removed after the court case between Grosset & Dunlap, Simon & Schuster, and the Stratmeyer Syndicate was settled.

Plot summary
During their father's investigation of the ruthless Scorpio gang of terrorists, the Hardy Boys witness an explosion and an  elephant falling from an airship named Safari Queen of Quinn Airport which was carrying animals of the newly opened Wild World Zoo.  Strange events are happening at Wild World, so the Hardy Boys search for the truth.
They fall into a trap and almost escape injury. They capture the gang in an all-out fight.

References

The Hardy Boys books
1979 American novels
1979 children's books
Grosset & Dunlap books